The 2014 World Junior Ice Hockey Championships (formerly called the IIHF U20 World Championship) was the 38th edition of the Ice Hockey World Junior Championship (WJHC), hosted in Malmö, Sweden. The 13,700-seat Malmö Arena was the main venue, with the smaller Malmö Isstadion the secondary venue. It began on December 26, 2013, and ended with the gold medal game on January 5, 2014.

Finland defeated host team Sweden in the final 3–2 in overtime and won their first gold medal since 1998, as well as their third gold medal in total. It was also their first medal in the tournament since 2006. Sweden earned their second consecutive silver medal, their ninth silver medal in total, as well as their third consecutive medal in the tournament.

For the first time since 1979–81, Canada failed to capture a medal for the second consecutive year by losing the bronze medal game 1–2 to Russia, who captured the team's fourth consecutive medal at the tournament. The 2014 tournament marked the first time since 1998 that all three medalists were European teams.

A total of 144,268 spectators attended the 31 games, setting a new attendance record for IIHF World Junior Championship tournaments hosted in Europe. 12,023 spectators attended the gold medal game, setting a new record for a single IIHF World Junior Championship game in Europe.

The playoff round was expanded to eight teams (again), with group leaders no longer getting a bye into the semifinals. The first time since the 2002 tournament.

Venues

Officials
The IIHF selected 12 referees and 10 linesmen to work the 2014 IIHF Ice Hockey U20 World Championship

They were the following:

Referees
  Tobias Björk
  Antti Boman
  Jacob Grumsen
  Rene Hradil
  Jozef Kubus
  Marcus Linde
  Timothy Mayer
  Steve Papp
  Devin Piccott
  Evgeniy Romasko
  Daniel Stricker
  Marc Wiegand

Linesmen
  Kenji Kosaka
  Andreas Kowert
  Benoît Martineau
  Fraser McIntyre
  Eduard Metalnikov
  Joris Müller
  Henrik Pihlblad
  Joonas Saha
  Peter Šefčík
  Rudolf Tosenovjan

Format
A change in format was implemented for the Top Division. The four best ranked teams from each group of the preliminary round advanced to the quarterfinals, while the last placed teams from each group played a relegation round in a best of three format to determine the relegated team.  This format was last used in 2002, except the current tournament will not incorporate playoff games to determine places five through eight.

Player eligibility 
A player is eligible to play in the 2014 World Junior Ice Hockey Championships if:
 the player is of male gender;
 the player was born at the earliest in 1994, and at the latest, in 1999;
 the player is a citizen in the country he represents;
 the player is under the jurisdiction of a national association that is a member of the IIHF.

If a player who has never played in IIHF-organized competition wishes to switch national eligibility, he must have played in competitions for two consecutive years in the new country without playing in another country, as well as show his move to the new country's national association with an international transfer card. In case the player has previously played in IIHF-organized competition but wishes to switch national eligibility, he must have played in competitions for four consecutive years in the new country without playing in another country, he must show his move to the new country's national association with an international transfer card, as well as be a citizen of the new country. A player may only switch national eligibility once.

Top Division

Rosters

Preliminary round 
All times are local (UTC+1).

Group A

Group B

Relegation round 

The relegation round was a best-of-three series. Norway lost two games and was relegated to Division I for 2015.

Playoff round

Quarterfinals

Semifinals

Bronze medal game

Final

Statistics

Scoring leaders 

GP = Games played; G = Goals; A = Assists; Pts = Points; +/− = Plus-minus; PIM = Penalties In MinutesSource: IIHF.com

Goaltending leaders 
(minimum 40% team's total ice time)

TOI = Time on ice (minutes:seconds); GA = Goals against; GAA = Goals against average; Sv% = Save percentage; SO = ShutoutsSource: IIHF.com

Tournament awards

Reference: 
Most Valuable Player
 Forward:  Filip Forsberg

All-star team

 Goaltender:  Juuse Saros
 Defencemen:  Nikita Zadorov,  Rasmus Ristolainen
 Forwards:  Anthony Mantha,  Teuvo Teräväinen,  Filip Forsberg

IIHF best player awards

 Goaltender:  Oscar Dansk
 Defenceman:  Rasmus Ristolainen
 Forward:  Filip Forsberg

Final standings

Note that due to the lack of playoff games for determining the spots 5–8, these spots were determined by the regulation round records for each team.

Medalists

Source:
1
2
3

Division I

Division I A
The Division I A tournament was played in Sanok, Poland, from 15 to 21 December 2013.

Division I B
The Division I B tournament was played in Dumfries, Great Britain, from 9 to 15 December 2013.

Team Great Britain was disqualified due to use of an ineligible player and was relegated to the 2015 Division II A.

Division II

Division II A
The Division II A tournament was played in Miskolc, Hungary, from 15 to 21 December 2013.

Division II B
The Division II B tournament was played in Jaca, Spain, from 11 to 17 January 2014.

Division III

The Division III tournament was played in İzmir, Turkey, from 12 to 18 January 2014.

References

External links
Official Site

 
World Junior Ice Hockey Championships
World Junior Ice Hockey Championships
World Junior Ice Hockey Championships
2014 World Junior Ice Hockey Championships
International sports competitions in Malmö
World Junior Ice Hockey Championships
World Junior Ice Hockey Championships
World Junior Ice Hockey Championships, 2014
Events at Malmö Arena